David Nash (15 July 1939 – 30 October 2016) was a Wales international rugby union player. A number 8 forward, he attained 6 caps for Wales between 1960 and 1961. Nash was selected for the 1962 British Lions tour of South Africa. He played his club rugby for Ebbw Vale.

In 1967 Nash was appointed as the first national coach of the Wales national rugby union team. He was appointed to coach Wales for the season, but having won one and drawn one out of the five international matches played, he resigned when the Welsh Rugby Union refused to allow him to accompany Wales on their 1968 tour of Argentina. Eventually, the WRU reversed their decision, appointing Clive Rowlands to tour as coach. He died in 2016, aged 77.

References

External links
Wales profile

1939 births
2016 deaths
Barbarian F.C. players
British & Irish Lions rugby union players from Wales
Crumlin RFC players
Ebbw Vale RFC players
Monmouthshire County RFC players
Rugby union players from Caerphilly County Borough
Wales international rugby union players
Wales national rugby union team coaches
Welsh rugby union coaches
Welsh rugby union players